Wataru Morishige (born 17 July 2000) is a Japanese speed skater who represented Japan at the 2022 Winter Olympics.

Career
Morishige competed at the 2022 Winter Olympics in the 500 metres and won a bronze medal with a time of 34.50 seconds.

Personal records

References

External links

2000 births
Living people
Japanese male speed skaters
Olympic speed skaters of Japan
Speed skaters at the 2022 Winter Olympics
Medalists at the 2022 Winter Olympics
Olympic medalists in speed skating
Olympic bronze medalists for Japan
Competitors at the 2023 Winter World University Games
Medalists at the 2023 Winter World University Games
Universiade medalists in speed skating
Universiade gold medalists for Japan
21st-century Japanese people
World Single Distances Speed Skating Championships medalists